Jindřichohradecké místní dráhy (Jindřichův Hradec Local Railways) is the company which operates the narrow gauge railway lines from Jindřichův Hradec to Nová Bystřice and Obrataň in the Czech Republic. Both lines are  gauge.

History
The line to Nová Bystřice was opened on 1 November 1897 and the line to Obrataň followed on 24 December 1906.

Both lines were originally operated with steam locomotives and there were engine sheds at Jindřichův Hradec, Kamenice nad Lipou, Nova Bystřice und Obrataň. Soon after opening a goods service with roll-blocks was established.

Following the founding of Czechoslovakia the railway became part of ČSD in 1924 and during World War II they came under the control of the Deutsche Reichsbahn

In 1998 both lines were privatised and they are now owned and operated by JHMD.

Route
Near Jindřichův Hradec there is a section of dual gauge track on the  České dráhy line between Veselí nad Lužnicí and Jihlava.

Current operations
Most trains consist of a diesel locomotive and one carriage. During the summer steam trains with historic carriages are operated for tourists.
In September 2022, after years of financial difficulties and mismanagement, the company went bankrupt and the operations were stopped.

Rolling stock

Locomotives

For the opening of the line to Nova Bystřice there were three 0-6-2 steam locomotives, like those used on the Murtalbahn. These were classified as class U (after Unzmarkt on the Murtalbahn) by the kkStB and were numbered U.1 – U.3. After the opening of the line to Obrataň in 1906 two more class U locomotives were acquired and numbered U.33 and U.34. In 1908 another locomotive, numbered U.41, was also acquired. After World War I only U.1, U.34 and U.41 remained in Jindřichův Hradec and in 1924 when ČSD took over the railway they were reclassified as U 37 and renumbered U 37.001, U 37.005 and U 37.006. ČSD bought three class U 47 Mallet locomotives and rented a further two identical locomotives for use on the lines.

A U 37 and a U 47 are used on the railway today for tourist trains. In addition to these a Romanian Reșița locomotive, numbered U 46.001 by JHMD, and a Polish Px48, now numbered U46.101, have been bought by JHMD for tourist trains.

Since 1955 traffic has mainly been handled by ČSD class T 47.0 diesel locomotives . In the 1970s more of these locomotives were transferred to Jindřichův Hradec when the Frýdlant–Heřmanice and Ružomberok–Korytnica narrow gauge railways were closed.

A PKP class Lxd2 locomotive, now numbered T 48.001, and a PKP class MBxd2, now numbered M 27.001, are also in use by JHMD.

Railcars

From 1929 two ČSD class M 11.0 railcars, which were narrow gauge versions ČSD Class M 120.4, were introduced. In 1939 two further railcars, this time ČSD class M 21.0 were acquired. Railcar services continued until shortly after World War II. Railcar M 21.004 is currently at Čierny Balog on the Čierny Hron Railway.

Four modernised 805.9 railcars have been obtained to run services.

Carriages

At first two-axled carriages manufactured by Ringhoffer in Prague were used. In the 1960s several four-axled carriages originally from Saxony were brought to Jindřichův Hradec from the Frýdlant-Heřmanice Railway, where they had been used since 1945. These carriages remained in use until the end of the 1970s.

The class Balm/u carriages in use today were manufactured by ČKD in the 1960s. When they were built these were modern carriages with wooden benches, oil heating, fluorescent lights and toilets.

In the 1980s the last remaining two-axled carriages were used to form a museum train, which is used in summer for the tourist steam trains.

Goods wagons
Goods traffic was originally carried in two-axled goods wagons, most of which were built by the Grazer Wagen- und Waggonfabrik AG (Graz Wagon Factory). Roll-blocks were introduced in 1906 and are still used today. The newest roll-blocks were built by Poprad Wagon Factory in the 1980s.

See also
 Narrow gauge railways in the Czech Republic

References

External links

 Official Website of JHMD (Czech and English)

Railway companies of the Czech Republic
Railway lines opened in 1897
Railway lines opened in 1906
760 mm gauge railways in the Czech Republic
1906 establishments in Austria-Hungary